Events in the year 1720 in Norway.

Incumbents
Monarch: Frederick IV

Events
 14 July – Denmark-Norway leaves the Great Northern War after the Treaty of Frederiksborg.
10 August – The town of Moss was founded.

Arts and literature

Births
 16 March – Cecilie Christine Schøller, socialite  (died 1786).
2 October – Jens Kraft, mathematician (died 1765).

Deaths

25 January - Jens Bircherod, bishop (born 1664).
12 November - Peter Tordenskjold, nobleman and naval flag officer (born 1690).

See also

References

 
Denmark
Denmark